An England national cricket team, organised by Marylebone Cricket Club (MCC), toured South Africa from November 1922 to March 1923 and played a five-match Test series against the South Africa national cricket team. England won the Test series 2–1. South Africa were captained by Herbie Taylor and England by Frank Mann. The England team was well below full strength.

Test series summary

First Test

Second Test

Third Test

Fourth Test

Fifth Test

References

External links
 Marylebone Cricket Club in South Africa 1922-23 at CricketArchive
 Test Cricket Tours – England to South Africa 1922-23

1922 in English cricket
1922 in South African cricket
1923 in English cricket
1923 in South African cricket
1922-23
International cricket competitions from 1918–19 to 1945
South African cricket seasons from 1918–19 to 1944–45
November 1922 events
December 1922 sports events
January 1923 sports events
February 1923 sports events
March 1923 sports events